Ronaldo Daniel Chacón Zambrano (born 18 February 1998) is a Venezuelan footballer who plays as a forward for Venezuelan Primera División club Carabobo.

International career
Chacón was called up to the Venezuela under-20 side for the 2017 FIFA U-20 World Cup. He played in the final, as his side were beaten by England.

Career statistics

Club

Notes

Honours

International
Venezuela U-20
FIFA U-20 World Cup: Runner-up 2017
South American Youth Football Championship: Third Place 2017

References

1998 births
Living people
People from San Cristóbal, Táchira
Venezuelan footballers
Venezuela youth international footballers
Venezuelan expatriate footballers
Association football forwards
Deportivo Táchira F.C. players
Caracas FC players
FK Senica players
Academia Puerto Cabello players
Venezuelan Primera División players
Slovak Super Liga players
Venezuelan expatriate sportspeople in Slovakia
Expatriate footballers in Slovakia